United States Bakery, better known as Franz Family Bakeries, is a bread and pastry manufacturer headquartered in Portland, Oregon. Franz Bakery was founded in 1906. U.S. Bakery also owns the Northwest regional bread brands Williams', Gai's, and Snyder's.

History

In collaboration with Engelbert Franz of Franz Bakery, W.P. Yaw of Yaw's Top Notch Restaurant invented the  diameter hamburger bun in the late 1920s. Though others are credited with creating a bread product to use for the first hamburgers known to the world, Franz is credited for inventing the hamburger bun in its current worldwide accepted form.

Acquisitions

United States Bakery has a long history of growth through acquisition.

In 2006, the Williams' factory, which had operated on the same site near the University of Oregon (UO) since 1908, was closed and the site sold to UO, which eventually built its current basketball venue, Matthew Knight Arena, there. Williams' relocated to a new plant in the Glenwood area of neighboring Springfield. It was the first new bakery the firm had built from the ground up since 1906.

In 2013, United States Bakery paid $28.85 million for Hostess' Sweetheart, Eddy's, Standish Farms, and Grandma Emilie's brands.

Guinness World Record

See also 
 List of food companies

References

External links

Franz Family Bakeries (official website)
United States Bakery profile from Hoover's
Historic images of Franz Bakery from Salem Public Library

Manufacturing companies based in Portland, Oregon
Bakeries of the United States
Food and drink companies established in 1906
Food and drink companies based in Portland, Oregon
Privately held companies based in Oregon
1906 establishments in Oregon